The 1876 Stevens football team was an American football team that represented Stevens Institute of Technology in the 1876 college football season. The team compiled a 2–2 record in games against Rutgers, Columbia, and NYU.

Schedule

References

Stevens
Stevens Tech Ducks football seasons
Stevens football